Rudin (also Romanized as Rūdīn; also known as Rūdī) is a village in Raviz Rural District, Koshkuiyeh District, Rafsanjan County, Kerman Province, Iran. At the 2006 census, its population was 161, in 56 families.

References 

Populated places in Rafsanjan County